The 1980 Primera División season was the 89th season of top-flight football in Argentina. River Plate won the Metropolitano (20th title) while Rosario Central (3rd title) won the Nacional championship.

All Boys, Quilmes and Tigre were relegated.

Metropolitano Championship

Nacional Championship

Group A

Group B

Group C

Group D

Quarterfinals

|-
|}

Semifinals

|-
|}

Finals

|-
|}
Rosario Central won the championship 5–3 on aggregate.

First leg

Second leg

References

Argentine Primera División seasons
Primera Division
Arg